The Ford Territory is the name used by Ford on the following SUVs:

 Ford Territory (Australia), a SUV made by Ford Australia. 
 Ford Territory (China), a SUV made by JMC-Ford in China for Southeast Asia and Latin America.